Jeanine van Dalen (born 18 June 1986) is a Dutch former footballer, who played as a defender. She has previously played for ADO Den Haag and for the Netherlands national team.

Club career
In 2007, Van Dalen moved from RVVH to ADO Den Haag in the newly formed Women's Eredivisie. She played for ADO Den Haag until 2012, winning the Double in the 2011–12 season.

International career
Van Dalen made her debut for the national team on 20 August 2005, in a 4–0 friendly defeat against Finland.

She was part of the Netherlands squad at the UEFA Women's Euro 2009, but made no appearances during the tournament.

Honours

Club
ADO Den Haag
 Women's Eredivisie: 2011–12
 KNVB Women's Cup: 2011–12

Individual
 Women's Eredivisie Golden Shoe: 2008–09 (with Sheila van den Bulk)

References

External links 
 

1986 births
Living people
Dutch women's footballers
Netherlands women's international footballers
Women's association football defenders
Eredivisie (women) players
ADO Den Haag (women) players
Footballers from Rotterdam
21st-century Dutch women